Reconquête, styled as Reconquête! (R!), is a nationalist political party in France founded in late 2021 by Éric Zemmour, who has since served as its leader. He was a far-right candidate in the 2022 presidential election, in which he placed fourth with just over 7% of the vote as the best newcomer.

History

Background 
From September 2021, opinion polling for the 2022 presidential election showed a sharp rise in favour of far-right journalist and author Éric Zemmour in the months before he officialised his candidacy. A series of polls suggested that he might reach the presidential election's second round, competing against incumbent President Emmanuel Macron. Although there had been speculation about a possible run for the presidential nomination of The Republicans in the party's 2021 congress, Zemmour opted to put his name forward as a new party nominee.

Launch 
Éric Zemmour formally announced his candidacy for the presidency on 30 November 2021 through a video posted on YouTube. It was seen by over 2.6 million viewers in three days.

Reconquête was launched on 5 December 2021; at the founding rally held in Villepinte, Seine-Saint-Denis, Zemmour proposed a "reconquest of the greatest country in the world" in front of 15,000 people. Zemmour and Reconquête's campaign directors for the upcoming elections were announced as Court of Audit magistrate Sarah Knafo and former French Army major general Bertrand de La Chesnais. Reconquête's youth wing, Génération Z, which had been established to mobilise the youth around a possible presidential candidacy of Zemmour, entered the party structure ex post.

In December 2021, Joachim Son-Forget, elected to the National Assembly in 2017 for French residents overseas as a La République En Marche! candidate, was the first MP to support Zemmour.  Former presidential candidate Philippe de Villiers also announced his support for Zemmour and the party. 
Zemmour made claims to the media of 40,000 members within days, 60,000 a few days later. In February 2022, Reconquête officially welcomed its 100,000th member.

In January 2022, the party gained its second member of the National Assembly in Guillaume Peltier, previously elected as a member of The Republicans, as well as two Members of the European Parliament (MEPs) when Jérôme Rivière and Gilbert Collard defected from the National Rally. Rivière had presided over the French delegation to the Identity and Democracy group in the European Parliament until he joined Reconquête. In early February 2022, the party gained a third MEP when Maxette Grisoni-Pirbakas defected from the National Rally, while MEP Nicolas Bay joined in mid-February. Stéphane Ravier became the party's first Senator after he left the National Rally in mid-February 2022, whilst  became the second Senator in March 2022. In May 2022 Myriane Houplain became the partys second MP.

Other notable people who have been involved around Zemmour's candidacy include former MPs Marion Maréchal, Christine Boutin, Nicolas Dhuicq, Jean-Frédéric Poisson and Jacques Bompard, as well as former MEPs Jean-Yves Le Gallou, Paul-Marie Coûteaux and Bruno Mégret.

Online controversy 

In February 2022, a reporter embedded into the Zemmour campaign's online division discovered and reported on a covert online campaign targeting Facebook and Wikipedia. A "shadow army" was delegated to join a huge number of Facebook groups and post pro-Zemmour content to raise the candidate's profile as much as possible. Another group of the shadow online team is a task force called "WikiZedia" which is tasked with editing pages on Wikipedia, in particular the French article about Zemmour, which is the top viewed article on French Wikipedia. "WikiZedia" members are charged with promoting Zemmour's page and linking to it as much as possible at the online encyclopedia. A veteran editor of French Wikipedia who was one of its top contributors was identified as being part of the Zemmour shadow team, described as being "in charge of the Zemmour page on Wikipedia" and was blocked from editing by Wikipedia administrators, along with six other editors. As soon as they learned of the affair, Wikimedia France immediately alerted the French media online watchdog agency ARCOM, which tracks online piracy and manipulation of digital communications.

Leadership 

Reconquête is led by Éric Zemmour from Paris, the party's founder and candidate in the 2022 presidential election. He is assisted by three vice chairmen, Guillaume Peltier, Marion Maréchal, and Nicolas Bay.

Ideology 

Reconquête vows to bolster the French economy in line with what some observers have called a Colbertist approach, as well as avoid what it calls the "Great Replacement" of the French people. Its main campaign themes are identity, education, taxes, industry and independence. It advocates for a reduction in immigration numbers, de-Islamisation, security through new deportation legislation, an improvement in public instruction levels with a revision of the collège system, lower taxes for the least prosperous French people, as well as higher economic competitivity. Speaking at the founding rally, Zemmour promised to "slash immigration to almost zero", to deport people who unsuccessfully sought asylum and illegal immigrants, as well as to remove France from NATO's integrated command.

In terms of economic policy, Reconquête seeks to implement a "country-score" which would clearly indicate to the consumer whether a product is French or not.

In foreign policy, the party seeks to strengthen French fiscal and political autonomy against the European Union (EU). Zemmour has expressed support for Brexit and the UK's vote to leave the EU, but argued that France's situation was different and that he would not seek to withdraw France from the EU. Instead, he has summed up his position as "I want France to be in Europe, but I want France to come first before Europe" and pledged to veto any further EU expansion plans. He has also stated the platform will include withdrawing France from EU immigration and asylum policies, ensuring the French tricolour is always displayed above the EU flag, putting French law above EU law and halting accession talks with Eastern European nations looking to join. Reconquête is also opposed to the accession of Turkey to the European Union.

Islam 
The party supports banning the Islamic veil in all public places.

Reconquête seeks to ban the Muslim Brotherhood and linked organisations. The party also wants to place a ban on structures that seek to promote Jihad. It would like to put into practice a tighter control of imams and Islamic preachers in mosques and other Islamic sites in France, including tighter control of external funding for these places of worship and preachers.

Election results

Presidential

National Assembly

Notable members 
Sarah Knafo
Philippe de Villiers
Guillaume Peltier
Jérôme Rivière
Jean Messiha
Gilbert Collard
Maxette Grisoni-Pirbakas
Stéphane Ravier
Bertrand de La Chesnais
Nicolas Bay
Marion Maréchal
Nicolas Dhuicq

References

External links
  Official website

Far-right political parties in France
French nationalist parties
National conservative parties
Right-wing populist parties
Right-wing populism in France
Eurosceptic parties in France
Anti-immigration politics in Europe
Anti-Islam political parties in Europe
Political parties established in 2021
Political parties of the French Fifth Republic
2021 establishments in France
Éric Zemmour